Marek Citko (born 27 March 1974 Białystok) is a retired Polish football player, who most frequently performed as an offensive midfielder. His first club was Włókniarz Białystok and his last - Polonia Warsaw. During the professional career Citko was representing numerous clubs in Poland and outside the native country: Włókniarz Białystok, Jagiellonia Białystok, Widzew Łódź, Legia Warsaw, Dyskobolia Grodzisk Wielkopolski, Hapoel Be'er Sheva, FC Aarau, Cracovia and Polonia Warsaw.

Successes

2x Polish Champion (1996, 1997) with Widzew Łódź.
1x Polish SuperCup Winner (1996) with Widzew Łódź.

Widzew Łódź and the Champions League
Being a player of Widzew Łódź, Citko achieved his greatest successes in football. In 1996 and 1997 Widzew trained by Franciszek Smuda, the former coach of the Polish national team, won Ekstraklasa (the highest level of football cup-ties in Poland) and the Polish SuperCup in 1996. In the season 1996/1997 Widzew, with Citko in the line-up, represented Poland in the Champions League. Although Citko played a few successful matches (he scored goals against Borussia Dortmund and Atlético Madrid), his team was eliminated from the cup after the group stage. What made the biggest impression on foreign observers was a goal scored by Citko in the match against Atletico (1:4) which took place on the Widzew's stadium at Piłsudskiego Street in Łódź. The 22-year-old Pole kicked a ball from nearly 40 metres to the goal and lobbed Jose Francisco Molina, the then goalkeeper of the Spain national team.

International matches
During his stint in Widzew, Citko won 10 caps for Poland (he scored two goals against Brazil and England). On 9 October, in the 1996 World Cup qualifier at Wembley Stadium in London, the player managed to score the opening goal against David Seaman. Regardless of the fact that Poland lost the match 1:2, many clubs began to court Citko. It was expected that the Pole would join Blackburn Rovers playing in the Premier League but he decided not to leave his country, explaining that he wished to train as a priest. He was also linked with Liverpool.

International goals

Big popularity in Poland
Scoring a goal against eternal rivals made Citko one of the most famous sportsmen in Poland. The player came first in a contest organized by the Polish Television (TVP), Polish Radio Program 3 (PR3) and "Super Express" (a Polish daily newspaper). What's most surprising, the contest concerned 1996 - the year of the Summer Olympics in Atlanta where Polish sportsmen won 7 gold medals (17 overall). What's more, Citko won a prize of "Revelation of the year" granted by "Piłka Nożna" (the most popular football weekly in Poland) and was 10th in the contest of "Przegląd Sportowy" (the only Polish sports daily).

A severe injury
Shortly thereafter, on 17 May 1997 in the match between Widzew and Górnik Zabrze, Citko suffered a serious Achilles tendon injury, and after his 16-month recuperation was unable to capture his previous form. He spent the rest of his career playing for lower profile sides. Representing Polonia Warsaw in the season 2006/2007, the Pole scored the second, with respect to estetic reasons, fantastic goal in his career. Citko managed to score directly from the corner kick. The player retired on 29 June 2007 being considered one of the most unfulfilled Polish talents in football.

References

External links 
 

1974 births
Living people
Polish footballers
Jagiellonia Białystok players
Widzew Łódź players
Legia Warsaw players
Dyskobolia Grodzisk Wielkopolski players
Hapoel Be'er Sheva F.C. players
Expatriate footballers in Israel
MKS Cracovia (football) players
Polonia Warsaw players
Poland international footballers
Sportspeople from Białystok
Association football midfielders